Girma Berhanu (born 19 July 1960) is a retired Ethiopian cross country runner.

Achievements

References

1960 births
Living people
Ethiopian male long-distance runners
Ethiopian male cross country runners
20th-century Ethiopian people
21st-century Ethiopian people